Qafë-Mali is a village and a former municipality in the Shkodër County, northern Albania. At the 2015 local government reform it became a subdivision of the municipality Fushë-Arrëz. The population at the 2011 census was 1,548.

Settlements 
There are 9 settlements within Qafë-Mali: 
Armiraj 
Kryezi
Lajthizë
Lumbardhë
Mollkuqe
Orosh
Qafë-Mali 
Srriqe
Tuç

References 

Administrative units of Fushë-Arrëz
Former municipalities in Shkodër County
Villages in Shkodër County
Mountain passes of Albania